The Elster Viaduct near Pirk, part of Weischlitz municipality, is one of the most unusual motorway bridges in Germany. The building of this bridge began in 1937, but was stopped in 1940 due to the chaos created by World War II. Since this bridge then was in the restricted area of the East Germany, construction was not restarted until 1990. In June 1990 preliminary investigations began, and finally in September 1990 the building of the bridge began anew. In August 1993 the bridge was opened to traffic. Federal Motorway 72 (Ger. Bundesautobahn 72) now uses the bridge.

Bridges completed in 1993
Buildings and structures in Saxony
Road bridges in Germany
Viaducts in Germany
White Elster
Weischlitz